Neustadt/ Westerwald is an Ortsgemeinde – a community belonging to a Verbandsgemeinde – in the Westerwaldkreis in Rhineland-Palatinate, Germany.

Geography

Location
The community lies in the Westerwald between Siegen and Limburg an der Lahn. Through the community flows the Große Nister. Neustadt belongs to the Verbandsgemeinde of Rennerod, a kind of collective municipality. Its seat is in the like-named town.

Neighbouring communities
Neustadt is surrounded by the communities of Niederroßbach in the north, Emmerichenhain in the east, Hellenhahn-Schellenberg in the south and Höhn in the west.

History
In 1384, Neustadt/Westerwald had its first documentary mention.

Religion
Roughly 82% of the population is Catholic with the other 18% following either another or no faith.

Politics

Community council
The council is made up of 12 council members who were elected in a majority vote in a municipal election on 13 June 2004.

Coat of arms
The wavy bend sinister in the community's arms stands for its location on the Große Nister. The black eagle in gold – the Imperial eagle – symbolizes today's rural area of Forstwiese, which was once an Imperial forest. The waterwheel stands for the two former mills at Neustadt, which did grinding for the Neustadt-Hellenhahn-Schellenberg milling region. The tinctures gold and blue are Nassau's (golden lion in blue) and refer to the community's former territorial allegiance.

Town partnerships

Neustadt is a member of the international town friendship group Neustadt in Europa with 34 members in five countries (as of 15 August 2005).

Culture and sightseeing
Holzbachschlucht (gorge near Seck)
Wacholderheide (juniper heath near Westernohe)

Economy and infrastructure

Right near the community run Bundesstraßen 54, linking Limburg an der Lahn with Siegen, and 255, leading from Montabaur to Herborn. The nearest Autobahn interchange is Haiger/Burbach on the A 45 (Dortmund–Hanau), some 18 km away. The nearest InterCityExpress stop is the railway station at Montabaur on the Cologne-Frankfurt high-speed rail line.

References

External links
Neustadt in the collective municipality’s Web pages 
Städtefreundschaft Arbeitsgemeinschaft Neustadt in Europa 

Westerwaldkreis